Alexander Manuel Colomé Pérez (born December 31, 1988) is a Dominican professional baseball pitcher in the Washington Nationals organization. He has played in Major League Baseball (MLB) for the Tampa Bay Rays, Seattle Mariners, Chicago White Sox, Minnesota Twins and Colorado Rockies.

Professional career

Tampa Bay Rays
At age eighteen, Colomé signed with the Tampa Bay Devil Rays as an amateur free agent in March 2007. The Rays added him to their 40-man roster on November 18, 2011.

The Rays promoted Colomé to the major leagues on May 29, 2013. He started 3 games, posting a 2.25 earned run average (ERA).

On March 24, 2014, Colomé was suspended 50 games for failing a random drug test. Colome ended the year 2–0 with a 2.66 ERA in 5 games, 3 of which were starts. Colomé saw his first significant playing time in 2015, most of it due to a switch to the bullpen, where he finished with 43 appearances and a 3.94 ERA.

In 2016, Colomé was named the full-time closer for the Rays due to an injury to Brad Boxberger. He kept the role as closer. He finished the season with 37 saves, fourth in the AL, and ended the season with a 1.91 ERA. Colome was also selected to his first career All-Star game.

In 2017, Colomé became the sixth player in franchise history to reach 40 saves in a season; he ended the season with 47 saves, which led the major leagues.

Seattle Mariners
On May 25, 2018, the Rays traded Colomé and outfielder Denard Span to the Seattle Mariners in exchange for minor leaguers Andrew Moore and Tommy Romero.

Chicago White Sox
On November 30, 2018, the Mariners traded Colomé to the Chicago White Sox in exchange for Omar Narváez. With the 2020 Chicago White Sox, Colomé appeared in 21 games, compiling a 2–0 record with 0.81 ERA and 16 strikeouts in 22.1 innings pitched.

Minnesota Twins
On February 12, 2021, Colomé officially signed a one-year, $5 million contract with the Minnesota Twins.

Colorado Rockies
On March 17, 2022, Colomé officially signed a one-year, $4.1 million contract with the Colorado Rockies. Colomé appeared in 53 games for the Rockies, but struggled to a 2–7 record and 5.74 ERA with four saves and 32 strikeouts in 47.0 innings pitched.

Washington Nationals
On January 27, 2023, Colomé signed a minor league contract with the Washington Nationals organization.

Personal life
Colomé is the nephew of former Rays reliever Jesús Colomé.

References

External links

 

1988 births
Living people
American League All-Stars
American League saves champions
Bowling Green Hot Rods players
Charlotte Stone Crabs players
Chicago White Sox players
Colorado Rockies players
Dominican Republic expatriate baseball players in the United States
Dominican Republic sportspeople in doping cases
Dominican Summer League Devil Rays players
Durham Bulls players
Hudson Valley Renegades players
Leones del Escogido players
Major League Baseball pitchers
Major League Baseball players from the Dominican Republic
Major League Baseball players suspended for drug offenses
Minnesota Twins players
Montgomery Biscuits players
Princeton Rays players
Seattle Mariners players
Sportspeople from Santo Domingo
Tampa Bay Rays players
World Baseball Classic players of the Dominican Republic
2017 World Baseball Classic players